Moulin and du Moulin are French-language surnames. "Moulin" literally means "mill".

The surname may refer to:
Arthur Moulin (1924–2017), French politician
Chris Moulin, English psychologist
Félix-Jacques Moulin (1802–1875), French photographer
Ginette Moulin (born 1926), French businesswoman
Henry du Moulin de Labarthète (1900–1948), French senior civil servant and diplomat
Hervé Moulin (born 1950), French economist
Hippolyte Moulin (1832–1884), French sculptor
Jean Moulin (1899–1943), member of the French Resistance during World War II
Jean-François-Auguste Moulin (1752–1810), French military officer and political leader
Jeanine Moulin (1912–1998), Belgian poet
Jessy Moulin (born 1986), French football player
Lewis Du Moulin, French Huguenot physician and controversialist, son of Pierre
Marc Moulin (1942–2008), Belgian musician
Marjatta Moulin (born 1926), Finnish fencer
Peter du Moulin, French-English Anglican clergyman and author, son of Pierre
Peter Ludwig du Moulin, (1681–1756), Prussian general
Pierre Moulin, French historian
Pierre Du Moulin (1568–1658), Huguenot minister and author in France
Pierre Moulin du Coudray de La Blanchère (1821–1880), French photographer
Stéphane Moulin (born 1967), French football player
Thibault Moulin (born 1990), French football player

French-language surnames